Avenir Dani (born 24 April 1965) is an Albanian footballer. He played in three matches for the Albania national football team in 1992.

References

External links
 

1965 births
Living people
Albanian footballers
Albania international footballers
Footballers from Shkodër
Association football goalkeepers
KF Vllaznia Shkodër players
FK Partizani Tirana players